Tre King is an American football running back for the Tulsa Oilers of the Indoor Football League (IFL). He played college football for the Texas Tech University.

Early life
King was born as one of five siblings in Wichita, Kansas and went to Wichita Heights High School. As a junior he immediately rushed for over 1,000 yards with 18 touchdowns and led his Flacons to the playoffs. This earned him the Topeka Capital-Journal’s All-Class honorable mention. The next season where he had a 8-3 season as a senior and an appearance in the Class 5A quarterfinals.

College career
After his last high school year he committed to Hutchinson Community College and became a member of the Blue Devils. There he racked up 43 yards in 8 carries in his freshman season 2015. As a sophomore he carried 90 times for 352 yards and five touchdowns before his seasons was cut short due to his first major injury. 
After his 2016 season he transferred to Texas Tech University and the Texas Tech Red Raiders football program. In his first game 2017 he scored a touchdown against the Eastern Washington Eagles. He finished his junior season as he ran for 623 yards, five scores and appeared in all of the 13 regular season game. He finished his last college season with 160 yards on 40 carries but appeared only in 6 games to a knee injury.

College statistics

Professional career

Cologne Centurions
The Cologne Centurions signed him for the 2022 season as last of their four American import roster spots.

Tulsa Oilers
On October 5, 2022, King signed with the Tulsa Oilers of the Indoor Football League (IFL).

Professional statistics

References

External links
ESPN statistics
Texas Tech Red Raiders bio
ELF bio

Living people
American football running backs
Players of American football from Kansas
Cologne Centurions (ELF) players
Year of birth missing (living people)
Texas Tech Red Raiders football players
Hutchinson Blue Dragons football players